Vil-Chukyleva is a rural locality (a village) in Oshibskoye Rural Settlement, Kudymkarsky District, Perm Krai, Russia. The population was 11 as of 2010.

Geography 
Vil-Chukyleva is located 28 km north of Kudymkar (the district's administrative centre) by road. Konanova is the nearest rural locality.

References 

Rural localities in Kudymkarsky District